Lismalady is a townland in County Westmeath, Ireland.

Lismalady is one of 14 townlands of the civil parish of Multyfarnham in the barony of Corkaree in the Province of Leinster.

The neighbouring townlands are: Tober to the north, Ballinphort to the north–east, Ballinriddera to the east, Killintown to the south–east, Multyfarnham or Fearbranagh to the south, Froghanstown to the west and Multyfarnham (townland) to the west.

In the 1911 census of Ireland there were 6 houses and 19 inhabitants in the townland.

References

External links
Map of Lismalady at openstreetmap.org
Lismalady at the IreAtlas Townland Data Base
Lismalady at Townlands.ie
Lismalady at The Placenames Database of Ireland

Townlands of County Westmeath